The 2012 SAFF Women's Championship is the 2nd SAFF Women's Championship since the first one in 2010. The competition is contested by the eight South Asian women football teams. India defended their 2010 title by defeating Nepal 3–1 in the final.

Venue
All matches were played at the CR & FC Grounds in Colombo. The stadium has a capacity of 5,555 seats.

Teams
Teams are:

Fixtures and results

Group A

Group B

Knockout stage

Semi finals

Final

Goalscorers
8 goals
  Jamuna Gurung

7 goals
  Yumnam Kamala Devi

5 goals
  Anu Lama
  Pinky Bompal Magar
  Oinam Bembem Devi

4 goals
  Dipa Adhikari
  Irom Prameshwori Devi

3 goals
  Sasmita Malik
  Sajana Rana

2 goals

  Marjan Haydaree
  Shabnam Rohin
  Salam Rinaroy Devi
  Supriya Routray
  Erandi Kumudumala
  Niru Thapa
  Hajra Khan

1 goals

  Hailai Arghandiwal
  Diba Naweed
  Suinu Pru Marma
  Aungmraching Marma
  Alochana Senapati
  Suprava Samal
  Nameirakpam Montesori Chanu
  Tuli Goon
  Ashem Romi Devi
  Fathimath Afza
  Pramila Rai
  Laxmi Poudel
  Malika-e-Noor
  Nilushika Kumari
  Praveena Perera
  Hasara Dilrangi
  Achala Chitrani

References

External links
 Details at Goalnepal.com
 Details at the-aiff.com

2012 in Asian football
2012 in women's association football
2010
2012
2012 in Bangladeshi football
2012–13 in Indian football
2012–13 in Pakistani football
2012 in Maldivian football
2012 in Bhutanese football
2012–13 in Sri Lankan football
2012 in Nepalese sport
2012 in Afghan football